South Seas Complex is a shopping mall owned and operated by the Store Zone Corporation, It is located in Magallanes St, Cotabato City, Philippines. The mall has a gross-floor area of 30,000 square meters est.

The Mall serves not only the consumers of Cotabato City but also residents of neighboring areas who come from as far away as the provinces of Maguindanao, North Cotabato and Sultan Kudarat.

References

Retail companies of the Philippines
Malls in Cotabato City

Tenants
Anchor Tenants
Super Market
Department Store
Arcade
Convention Center

Major Tenants
Chowking
Greenwich
Bench
Mossimo Jeans
Gibi Shoes
Mister Donuts 
Vanz
Red Ribbon
Goldilocks

ATM
Landbank
BPI

There are more or less 50 small tenants occupied on the mall.

Future Branches

External links
 South Seas Mall Website

Shopping malls in the Philippines
Buildings and structures in Cotabato City